3682 Welther, provisional designation , is a background asteroid from the central regions of the asteroid belt, approximately  in diameter. It was discovered on 12 July 1923, by German astronomer Karl Reinmuth at the Heidelberg Observatory in southwest Germany. The asteroid has a rotation period of 3.6 hours. It was named after Barbara Welther, an American historian of science at CfA.

Orbit and classification 

Welther is a non-family asteroid from the main belt's background population. It orbits the Sun in the central main-belt at a distance of 1.9–3.6 AU once every 4 years and 7 months (1,674 days; semi-major axis of 2.76 AU). Its orbit has an eccentricity of 0.32 and an inclination of 14° with respect to the ecliptic.

The body's observation arc begins at Heidelber and Vienna Observatory in August 1928, or four weeks after its official discovery observation at Heidelberg.

Physical characteristics 

Welther is an assumed C-type asteroid.

Rotation period 

Several rotational lightcurves of Welther have been obtained from photometric observations since 2001. Analysis of the best-rated lightcurves gave a rotation period of 3.5973 hours with a brightness amplitude of 0.22 and 0.21 magnitude, respectively. The observing French amateur astronomers also suspected the asteroid to be a binary system.

Diameter and albedo 

According to the surveys carried out by the Infrared Astronomical Satellite IRAS, the Japanese Akari satellite and the NEOWISE mission of NASA's Wide-field Infrared Survey Explorer, Welther measures between 11.13 and 19.34 kilometers in diameter and its surface has an albedo between 0.1189 and 0.26.

The Collaborative Asteroid Lightcurve Link derives an albedo of 0.0997 and a diameter of 19.24 kilometers based on an absolute magnitude of 11.7.

Naming 

This minor planet was named after American Barbara Welther (born 1938), a historian of science at the Harvard–Smithsonian Center for Astrophysics (CfA). The official naming citation was proposed by CfA's Planetary Sciences division and published by the Minor Planet Center on 1 September 1993.

Notes

References

External links 
 Asteroid Lightcurve Database (LCDB), query form (info )
 Dictionary of Minor Planet Names, Google books
 Asteroids and comets rotation curves, CdR – Observatoire de Genève, Raoul Behrend
 Discovery Circumstances: Numbered Minor Planets (1)-(5000) – Minor Planet Center
 
 

003682
Discoveries by Karl Wilhelm Reinmuth
Named minor planets
19230712